Just Around the Corner may refer to:
 Just Around the Corner (1938 film), an American musical comedy film
 Just Around the Corner (1921 film), an American silent drama film
 Just Around the Corner (song), a 1987 song by Cock Robin